Heathers: The Musical is a musical with music, lyrics and book by Laurence O'Keefe and Kevin Murphy, based on the 1989 film of the same name written by Daniel Waters. The producers include J. Todd Harris, Amy Powers, RJ Hendricks, and Andy Cohen. After a sold-out Los Angeles tryout, the show moved Off-Broadway in 2014. After the run in 2014, the show had an Off-West End run in 2018 and then transferred to the West End in 2018 for a limited engagement.

Although the show is a high-energy black comedy, it opens conversations about dark issues, including bullying, teen suicide, sexual assault, and school violence.

Synopsis

Act 1
In 1989, 17-year-old Veronica Sawyer despairs at Westerberg High School's hellish social hierarchy, where students like the heavyset Martha Dunnstock, Veronica's best friend, are tormented by jocks Ram Sweeney and Kurt Kelly, and the school is ruled by the Heathers: weak-willed Heather McNamara, bulimic and petty but repressed Heather Duke, and "mythic bitch" Heather Chandler. When Veronica's talent for forgery gets the Heathers out of detention, they give her a makeover and elevate her to their inner circle ("Beautiful").

Heather C. orders Veronica to forge a love letter from Ram to Martha, tempting Veronica with the promise of popularity ("Candy Store"). The mysterious, poetry-quoting new kid, Jason "J.D." Dean, criticizes Veronica for betraying her friend. After J.D. wins a fight against Ram and Kurt, Veronica finds herself unexpectedly attracted to him ("Fight for Me"). Veronica's parents confess to their daughter that they are not sure they like her new friends and would prefer if she was friends with Martha again. ("Candy Store (Playoff)").

Veronica flirts with J.D. at a 7-Eleven, where he extols the virtues of the Slurpee for numbing his grief ("Freeze Your Brain"). At Ram's homecoming party, Veronica gets increasingly drunk ("Big Fun"). When the Heathers cruelly prank Martha, Veronica angrily resigns from the clique and vomits on Heather C., who vows to destroy Veronica's reputation. With nothing left to live for, Veronica breaks into J.D.'s bedroom and has sex with him ("Dead Girl Walking").

After suffering tormenting dreams ("Veronica's Chandler Nightmare"), Veronica, with J.D. in tow, apologizes to Heather C. and mixes hangover cures for her.  J.D. adds toxic drain cleaner to his mug and goads Veronica into serving it to Heather C., who drops dead. Veronica panics, but J.D. convinces her to forge a suicide note, which paints a more complex, misunderstood Heather C. This fictionalized version of her wins the school's sympathy and she becomes even more worshipped in death than she was in life ("The Me Inside of Me").

Veronica tries to get on with her normal life, but she is berated and mocked by Heather C.'s ghost, who warns that she had kept the other two Heathers in check and with her gone, things will get worse. She tries to rescue the remaining Heathers from a drunk Kurt and Ram, who unsuccessfully try to rape her ("Blue" or "You’re Welcome"). An unleashed Heather D. assumes Heather C.'s status and symbolic red scrunchie, becoming even more of a tyrant than Heather C. was, while Ram and Kurt tell everyone they had sex with Veronica ("Blue (Reprise)" or "Never Shut Up Again"). Veronica is branded a slut ("Blue" (Playoff) - not included in West End and future productions), and when J.D. attacks the jocks to defend her, they savagely beat him.

J.D. and Veronica comfort each other and plan a vengeful prank: she will lure the jocks to the cemetery with the promise of making their fictional threesome real, then together they will shoot them with tranquilizer "" bullets to knock them out before leaving a forged suicide note confessing, they were gay lovers. When the jocks arrive, J.D. shoots Ram but Veronica misses Kurt. As she realizes Ram is dead and the bullets are real, J.D. shoots Kurt dead and proclaims his undying love to a horrified Veronica ("Our Love Is God").

Act 2
At Ram and Kurt's funeral, a distraught Veronica reflects that they could have outgrown their immaturity ("Prom or Hell?"). Grief-stricken, Ram's Dad chastises Kurt's Dad for remaining homophobic, until the latter suddenly kisses the former, revealing their own secret love affair. Confession brings catharsis and all vow to make the world a more tolerant place ("My Dead Gay Son"). Convinced the murders are for the greater good, J.D. urges Veronica to target Heather D. next. She refuses, so he complains about doing nothing in the face of injustice, revealing he witnessed his mother's suicide as a young boy, straining his relationship with his father and causing their constant moving around. Veronica gives him an ultimatum: give up violence and live a normal life with her or lose her forever ("Seventeen"). J.D. agrees and they reconcile. Martha tells Veronica she suspects J.D. of murdering the jocks, believing Ram's "love note" is proof. Veronica, urged on by Heather C.'s ghost, confesses that she forged the note to humiliate Martha, who runs off in tears.

Guidance counselor(Teacher in the West End production) Ms. Fleming holds a televised therapy assembly ("Shine a Light"). She urges everyone to reveal their fears and insecurities, but only Heather M. admits to suicidal thoughts ("Lifeboat"). Heather D. mocks her and whips the students into a frenzy. Veronica lashes out and blurts out a confession — "they didn't kill themselves! I killed them!" — but everyone laughs mockingly, believing she is only desperate for attention. Shortly after, Heather M. tries to kill herself by overdosing in the bathroom, while Heather D. taunts her in her subconscious ("Shine a Light (Reprise)"), but Veronica stops her. J.D., carrying a gun, tries to persuade Veronica to kill Heather D. once more. Realizing how unstable he is, Veronica breaks up with him. ("I Say No" in the West End version)

J.D. blackmails Heather D. into making the student body sign a petition. Martha, mourning Ram, jumps off a bridge ("Kindergarten Boyfriend"), but survives. Veronica rushes to the hospital, taunted by the ghosts of Kurt, Ram, and Heather C.; with her parents attempting to assure her that they have been through everything she is going through ("Yo Girl"). She returns home, where J.D. breaks in. As she barricades herself in the closet, he reveals the petition, signed by every student, is actually a mass suicide note — along with his plans to blow up the pep rally and make it look like a mass suicide, using his father's demolition expertise to devise the plan. He breaks open the closet to find Veronica dangling from a noose. Grief-stricken, he leaves to complete his plan ("Meant to Be Yours").

Veronica, having faked her suicide, races to stop J.D. ("Dead Girl Walking (Reprise)"). She confronts him in the boiler room, but in their struggle, J.D. is shot. Unable to disarm the detonator, Veronica takes it to the empty football field, out of range to detonate the bombs. J.D. convinces her to let him take the detonator instead ("I Am Damaged"). It explodes, killing him alone.

Returning to school, Veronica takes the red scrunchie from Heather D, kisses her on the cheek and ends the era of social ridicule. Veronica invites Martha and Heather M to hang out (depending on blocking, Heather D is also included in some productions), rent a movie, and be kids before childhood is over ("Seventeen (Reprise)").

Musical numbers

 Act I
 "Beautiful" – Veronica, H. Chandler, H. McNamara, H. Duke, Kurt, Ram, Martha, Ms. Fleming and Company
 "Candy Store" – H. Chandler, H. McNamara and H. Duke
 "Fight for Me" – Veronica and Students
 "Candy Store" (Playoff) † – H. Chandler, H. McNamara and H. Duke
 "Freeze Your Brain" – J.D.
 "Big Fun" – Ram, Kurt, Veronica, H. Chandler, H. McNamara, H. Duke, Martha, and Students
 "Dead Girl Walking" – Veronica and J.D.
 "Veronica's Chandler Nightmare" † – H. Chandler and Company
 "The Me Inside of Me" – H. Chandler, Veronica, J.D., Ms. Fleming, Principal, Coach, Cops and Company
 "Blue" (2010-2018) – Ram, Kurt, H. Duke and H. McNamara
 "You're Welcome" (2018–present) †† – Ram, Kurt, Veronica
 "Blue" (Reprise, 2010–2018) † – Ram, Kurt, H. Duke, H. McNamara and Students
 "Never Shut Up Again" (2018–present) †† – H. Duke, Ram, Kurt and Ensemble (Replaces "Blue" (Reprise) from the high school version)
 "Our Love Is God" – J.D., Veronica, Ram, Kurt and Company

 Act II
 "Prom or Hell?" † – Veronica
 "My Dead Gay Son" – Ram's Dad, Kurt's Dad and Mourners
 "Seventeen" – Veronica and J.D.
 "Shine a Light" – Ms. Fleming and Students
 "Lifeboat" – H. McNamara
 "Shine a Light" (Reprise) – H. Duke and Students
 "I Say No" (2018–present) †† – Veronica and Ensemble
 "Hey Yo, Westerberg" † – H. McNamara and Students
 "Kindergarten Boyfriend" – Martha
 "Yo Girl" – H. Chandler, Ram, Kurt, Veronica and Veronica's Mom
 "Meant to Be Yours" – J.D. and Students
 "Dead Girl Walking" (Reprise) – Veronica, J.D., Ms. Fleming, and Students
 "I Am Damaged" – J.D. and Veronica
 "Seventeen" (Reprise) – Veronica, Martha, H. McNamara, H. Duke and Company

† Not featured on any of the cast recordings.
†† Songs added to the West End version and all future productions.

"You're Welcome" replaces "Blue", a song on the World Premiere Cast Recording. "You're Welcome" was originally written by O'Keefe and Murphy for the High School edition but was added to the official show beginning with the 2018 London production. O'Keefe and Murphy preferred "You're Welcome" as "Blue" had been perceived by audiences as “treating date rape as a laughing matter” and trivializing the issue by presenting it as comical, “boyish antics”. When asked to comment on the choice to replace the track, O'Keefe and Murphy stated that "'You're Welcome' doesn’t shy away from showing that Veronica is in real danger from these two drunk football assholes."

A new song for Heather Duke, "Never Shut Up Again", was also added for the London run, replacing "Blue (Reprise)". For the 2017 workshop, there was a different song to replace "Blue (Reprise)", which became "Big Fun (Reprise)", part of which is now included in "Never Shut Up Again". In the last week at The Other Palace, the authors added a new song after "Shine a Light (Reprise)" called "I Say No", in which Veronica finally dumps J.D. when he proposes a return to murdering, telling him "You need help I can't provide" and walking out on him.  The song remained in the show for the Haymarket run and was released on February 15, 2019, as the first single on the West End cast album.

Background
Andy Cohen and J. Todd Harris secured the rights from Daniel Waters (the screenwriter of the film) and immediately thought of Andy Fickman to direct. After seeing Laurence O'Keefe's work with Legally Blonde and how he transitioned film to theatre, he decided to pair him with Reefer Madness collaborator Kevin Murphy. Originally, lyricist Amy Powers was on the creative team, but she transitioned to joining producers Cohen and Harris. Fickman, Murphy and O'Keefe were also producers on the original productions in Los Angeles and New York. Fickman said of the experience, "we found that Heathers gave a great deal of opportunity for '80s commentary and a great chance for music and storytelling."

Productions

Development
Three private readings of the work in progress were held in Los Angeles in 2009, each starring Kristen Bell as Veronica. The first was in March at the Beverly Hills offices of Endeavor Agency (starring Christian Campbell as J.D.); the second in June at the Hudson Theatre on Santa Monica Boulevard (starring Scott Porter as J.D.); and the third in December at the Coast Theatre in West Hollywood, starring James Snyder as J.D. In each reading, Jenna Leigh Green, Corri English, and Christine Lakin played Heather Chandler, Heather McNamara and Heather Duke respectively.

On September 13–14, 2010, Heathers was presented as a concert at Joe's Pub. The show was directed by Andy Fickman, and it starred Annaleigh Ashford as Veronica Sawyer, Jeremy Jordan as Jason Dean, Jenna Leigh Green as Heather Chandler, Corri English as Heather McNamara, and Christine Lakin as Heather Duke, James Snyder as Kurt Kelly, PJ Griffith as Ram Sweeney, Julie Garnyé as Martha "Dumptruck" Dunnstock, Eric Leviton as Ram's Dad, Kevin Pariseau as Kurt's Dad/Principal, Jill Abramovitz as Ms. Fleming/Veronica's Mom, Tom Compton as Hipster Dork/Preppy Kid, Alex Ellis as Goth Girl/English Teacher/Young Republicanette, and Lindsey Guerra as Stoner Chick/School Psychologist.

Los Angeles
The show played at the Hudson Backstage Theatre in Los Angeles for a limited engagement on the weekends from September 21, 2013, to October 6, 2013. The cast included Barrett Wilbert Weed as Veronica, Ryan McCartan as J.D., Sarah Halford as Heather Chandler, Kristolyn Lloyd as Heather Duke, and Elle McLemore as Heather McNamara. McLemore was the only Heather to remain with the cast when the show transferred to Off-Broadway, but after Alice Lee left the production, Kristolyn Lloyd reprised her role as Heather Duke. The production was music directed by Ryan Shore.

Off-Broadway
In 2013, it was announced that Heathers: The Musical would be brought to Off-Broadway, previews beginning in March at New World Stages, directed by Andy Fickman. Coincidentally, New World is also the name of the original film's distributor. In February 2014, the cast was announced, including Barrett Wilbert Weed, Ryan McCartan, and Elle McLemore reprising their roles as Veronica, J.D., and Heather McNamara, respectively, with new additions to the cast being Jessica Keenan Wynn as Heather Chandler, Alice Lee as Heather Duke and Tony Award winner Anthony Crivello as Bill Sweeney/'Big Bud' Dean. The show began previews on March 15, 2014, and opened on March 31, 2014.

A cast album was recorded on April 15–16, 2014, with an in-store and digital release of June 17, 2014. It was released a week early on June 10, 2014.

Heathers: The Musical played its final performance at New World Stages on August 4, 2014.

London 

A workshop of the musical opened at The Other Palace, London which held 5 presentations in the Studio from 30 May to June 3, 2017. The workshop featured Charlotte Wakefield as Veronica Sawyer.

Following the workshop, the musical had its official London premiere in the Theatre at The Other Palace, London from June 9 to August 4, 2018, starring Carrie Hope Fletcher as Veronica Sawyer and Jamie Muscato as J.D. The production is produced by Bill Kenwright and Paul Taylor-Mills, directed again by Andy Fickman and with choreographer/associate director Gary Lloyd. For the London production "Blue" has been changed to the new song "You're Welcome" and Heather Duke has received her own song "Never Shut Up Again" as well as a few script changes.

Heathers transferred to the West End at the Theatre Royal Haymarket, running from September 3, 2018 to November 24, 2018. A new song for Veronica, "I Say No", as well as a few script changes to Act 2 were added for the transfer.

A West End cast recording was released on Ghostlight Records on March 1. The album premiered at No. 1 on the iTunes UK Soundtracks Charts and at #2 on the iTunes UK Album charts. The album premiered at No. 24 on the Official Albums Chart.

On March 3, 2019, Heathers the Musical won the Best New Musical award at London's WhatsOnStage Awards. Carrie Hope Fletcher also won for Best Actress in a Musical.

UK/Ireland tours & West End revivals 
On October 3, 2019, it was announced via the Bill Kenwright LTD Twitter account that the show would embark on a UK & Ireland tour in 2020 which was later postponed until 2021 due to the coronavirus pandemic. The tour opened in Leeds on 5 August 2021 before visiting Liverpool, Nottingham, Newcastle, Sheffield, Birmingham, Canterbury, Manchester, Belfast, Dublin, Brighton, Wimbledon, Bristol, Milton Keynes, High Wycombe, Cardiff and finishing in Edinburgh. On April 8, 2021, it was announced that Heathers: The Musical would return to the West End on June 21, 2021, and will run at the Theatre Royal Haymarket until September 11, 2021. The West End revival cast was announced on May 28, with Jodie Steele reprising her role as Heather Chandler.
Another London revival was announced, dubbed the "Homecoming", with a limited run at The Other Palace. West End Revival ensemble members Teleri Hughes and Iván Fernández González returned to the production, as did Lizzie Bea, who portrayed Martha Dunnstock during the West End Workshop. The 2022 run at The Other Palace was set for a limited run ending on February 20, before it announced its extended run until May 1, 2022. It then extended its run further, until September 4, 2022. The show then extended until the 19th of February 2023 with a singalong performance on the 18th of January 2023.

The West End revival was filmed in May 2022 at The Other Palace and was released as a Roku Original on September 16, 2022.

On October 27, 2022, it was announced via the Heathers Twitter account that the show would embark on another UK & Ireland tour in 2023. It is planned to open in Windsor on 14 February 2023 before visiting Woking, Peterborough, Brighton, Bath, Mold, Plymouth, Stoke-on-Trent, Eastbourne, Dublin, York, Birmingham, Dartford, Aylesbury, Cheltenham, Norwich, Sunderland, Glasgow, Liverpool, Bradford, Malvern, Crawley, Manchester, Leicester, Cardif, Nottingham, Blackpool, Hull and Darlington.

Notable US regional productions 
In 2016 White Plains Performing Arts Center (WPPAC) presented the NY Regional Premiere of the production to sold-out audiences. Various local productions have cast a non-male actor as J.D., such as Stanford University's Ram's Head Theatrical Society in May 2021 featuring Emily Saletan as Janie "J.D." Dean.

Australia
The Australian premiere of Heathers: The Musical at the Hayes Theatre in Sydney was staged in July–August 2015. Directed by Trevor Ashley with choreography by Cameron Mitchell, it starred Jaz Flowers as Veronica Sawyer, Stephen Madsen as J.D., Lucy Maunder as Heather Chandler, Erin Clare as Heather McNamara, and Libby Asciak as Heather Duke. The well-received production transferred the following year, with mostly the same cast, for seasons in Brisbane (Playhouse, Queensland Performing Arts Centre) in January 2016, Melbourne (Playhouse, Arts Centre Melbourne) in May 2016, and the Sydney Opera House's Playhouse in June 2016.

Brazil
The Brazilian premiere of Heathers: The Musical at the Viradalata Theatre in São Paulo was staged in October–November 2019. Translated by Rafael Oliveira, directed by Fernanda Chamma and Daniela Stirbulov, with choreography by Mariana Barros, it started with Ana Luiza Ferreira as Veronica Sawyer, Diego Montez and Murilo Armacollo as J.D., Bruna Vivolo and Gigi Debei as Heather Chandler, Veronica Goeldi and Mariana Fernandes as Heather Duke, Carol Amaral, Isa Castro and Luisa Valverde as Heather McNamara. The well-received production soon was announced that it would return in May–June 2020 but it was cancelled due to the COVID-19 pandemic.

Cast

Critical reception

Off-Broadway 
Heathers: The Musical's 2014 Off-Broadway run was generally received well by critics and audiences alike. The musical was praised for staying true to the film while still having its own original additions to the storyline. The score and choreography of the musical were also given praise.

The musical, however, was criticized for the length and its characters not living up to the cast of the original movie. It has also been criticized for taking the dark themes of the source material and sanitizing them with bubbly music and cartoon-like characters.

Marilyn Stasio, writing for Variety, wrote, "[S]easoned industry pros could pick up a few tips on the Do's and Don'ts of adapting material from this smartly executed musical treatment of 'Heathers.'" She praised the lyrics but was not a fan of the music, writing: "Even at their giddiest, the lyrics never dumb down the characters singing them. Wish we could say the same for the music, which is brassy and blah and sounds nothing like the music that made the 80s."

The Hollywood Reporters David Rooney stated: "Does the acidic comedy gain anything from being turned into a cartoonish pop musical? Hell, no. But as an extension of the movie's wicked pleasures, this version has its silly charms, as demonstrated by the rowdy response of the predominantly young audience. It's not exactly very — to borrow from Heather-speak — but for insatiable fans it might almost be enough, and the tacky high school-style staging seems somehow appropriate."

The musical got two out of five stars from The Guardians Alexis Soloski, who wrote: "The off-Broadway adaptation of the 1988 Winona Ryder/Christian Slater teen movie is sunny and snarky, but the dark subject matter calls for something more wicked." But Elisabeth Vincentelli of the New York Post gave it four out of five stars, writing "The first act moves briskly as director Andy Fickman and his cast wring every last comic drop out of the script and songs... The production nearly derails in Act II, having killed off its antagonists. The film had the same problem, but here the sweetened worldview saps the grand finale of its effectiveness. Still, seeing “Heathers” onstage is a joy."

Kyle Anderson of Entertainment Weekly was harsher, giving the musical a C− rating: "Heathers: The Musical misses just about everything that made the film great, making it not only a colossally disappointing adaptation of a beloved property but also a generally unpleasant theater experience."

West End 
The London production received mixed reception and was flagged by some critics because they felt complex issues such as homosexuality, bulimia and suicide were made light of for comedic effect, making parts of the show feel "dated and uncomfortable for a 2018 audience."

Awards and nominations

Original Off-Broadway production

Original West End production

Heathers: The Musical (High School Edition) 
Following its 2014 Off-Broadway run, the musical gained cult status from audiences that mirrored the characters at the fictional Westerberg High, and multiple high schools were putting in requests for the licensing rights; accordingly, an abridged "PG-13" version was prepared, newly revised by writers Laurence O’Keefe and Kevin Murphy, iTheatrics, and licensing company Samuel French specifically for student productions. Most of the profanity in the show was deleted, "Big Fun", "Dead Girl Walking", and the majority of the songs received rewritten lyrics and one new song, "You're Welcome" was written for the show to replace "Blue". The original playwrights—O'Keefe and Murphy—have since publicly stated that they prefer "You're Welcome" to "Blue", and the change was officially made for the London production of Heathers in June 2018.

The world premiere of Heathers: The Musical (High School Edition) took place on September 15, 2016, at Pearce Theatre, J.J. Pearce High School, Richardson, Texas.

Brazilian version
The Brazilian version of Heathers: The Musical (High School Edition) or "Heathers - A Teen Musical" was set to open in 2020 at the Stunt Burger, but because of the COVID-19 pandemic it made some changes. The version was well received by both the audience and critics.

In popular culture
In 2019, a high school production of the musical is the focus of the "Chapter Fifty-One: Big Fun" episode of Riverdale. The Riverdale cast album of the musical was produced via WaterTower Music. The lyrics from the songs in the episode are from the High School Edition of the musical with most of the profanity deleted.

References

External links

2010 musicals
Musicals based on films
Plays set in the 1980s
Off-Broadway musicals
Teen musicals